Ali and Toumani is a 2010 record by Malian musicians Ali Farka Touré  on the guitar and providing vocals and Toumani Diabaté on the kora. The album was released after Touré's death in 2006.

Track listing

Musicians 
Ali Farka Touré – guitar (tracks 1-11)
Toumani Diabate – kora (tracks 1-11)
Orlando "Cachaíto" López – bass (tracks 1,2,5,6,11)
Vieux Farka Touré – congas (tracks 2,5,11) backing vocals (track 2)
Souleye Kané – backing vocals (track 2)
Ali Magassa – backing vocals (track 2)
Tim Keiper – percussion (track 5,11)

Professional reviews

References

External links 
Ali and Toumani at Nonesuch Records
Ali and Toumani at World Circuit Records
 

2010 albums
Ali Farka Touré albums
World Circuit (record label) albums